Burton is an unincorporated community in Madison County, in the U.S. state of Idaho.

History
The first settlement at Burton was made in 1884. The community has the name of Robert T. Burton, a member of the presiding bishopric of the Church of Jesus Christ of Latter-day Saints from 1874 until his death.

References

Unincorporated communities in Madison County, Idaho
Unincorporated communities in Idaho